Associazione Sportiva Dilettantistica Calcio Borgomanero is an Italian association football club located in Borgomanero, Piedmont. It currently plays in Serie D.

History 
In 2012–13 season Borgomanero won promotion to Serie D after finishing first in Eccellenza Piedmont and Aosta Valley Girone A.

The foundation 
It was founded in 1951 and spent several seasons in Serie D.

Colors and badge 
Its colors are blue and red.

References

External links 
 Official homepage

Association football clubs established in 1951
Football clubs in Piedmont and Aosta Valley
1951 establishments in Italy
Borgomanero